Björn Þórðarson (6 February 1879 – 25 October 1963) was prime minister of Iceland from 16 December 1942 to 21 October 1944, in the only government that did not rely on parliamentary support. He was prime minister when Iceland became a republic. His cabinet was named the Coca-Cola rule because two of its ministers started franchises of two big American companies during the US occupation during World War II. Vilhjálmur Þór, from the Progressive Party, took on Esso, and Björn Ólafsson, later a member of the Alþingi, founded Vífilfell, the company that sells Coca-Cola in Iceland.

External links
Biography on Alþingi

1879 births
1963 deaths
Bjorn Thordarson
Bjorn Thordarson
World War II political leaders